Michael Chang was the defending champion, but chose not to participate that year due to a stomach muscle strain.

Mark Philippoussis won in the final 6–3, 7–6(3), against Andre Agassi.

Players

Draw

Finals

Group one
Standings are determined by: 1. number of wins; 2. number of matches; 3. in two-players-ties, head-to-head records; 4. in three-players-ties, percentage of sets won, or of games won; 5. steering-committee decision.

Group two
Standings are determined by: 1. number of wins; 2. number of matches; 3. in two-players-ties, head-to-head records; 4. in three-players-ties, percentage of sets won, or of games won; 5. steering-committee decision.

External links
Official Colonial Classic website
1998 Colonial Classic results

1998
1998 in Australian tennis